Esfandiar Ahmadieh (1929–2012) was an Iranian animation film director. He is regarded as the "father of the Iranian animation". His most significant works include the films Molla Nasreddin, Satellite, Jealous Duck, Wheat Crop, and Where Are You Going Kite? He drew many of his animations with pencil.

His 90-minute film Rostam and Esfandiar (no relation to filmmaker) tells the story of the legendary hero Esfandiar, originally told if Ferdowsi's epic Shahnameh.

References

External links 

1929 births
2012 deaths
Iranian animators
Iranian animated film directors